Artem Radionov (born 3 September 1983) is a former professional Ukrainian football defender who became a football manager.

Radionov is a product of the Sumy specialized sports school of Olympic Reserve coached by Kostiantyn Zinoviev.

In 2000–01 season Radionov also played for futsal club Sumyhaz Sumy.

In 2001 Radionov joined the newly revived Yavir Krasnopillia which played in amateur championship. After playing four games in summer of 2001 he joined Spartak Sumy.

References

External links 
Official Website Profile

1983 births
Living people
Sportspeople from Sumy
Ukrainian footballers
Ukrainian men's futsal players
FC Vorskla Poltava players
FC Spartak Sumy players
PFC Sumy players
FC Stal Kamianske players
FC Helios Kharkiv players
FC Barsa Sumy players
FC Viktoriya Mykolaivka players
FC Viktoriya Mykolaivka managers
Association football defenders